KRTN-FM (93.9 FM) is a radio station broadcasting a variety format. Licensed to Enchanted Air, Inc. in Raton, New Mexico, United States. The station is providing services to the communities of Northeastern New Mexico and South-Central Colorado. It has 100 watt booster KRTN-FM1 licensed to Trinidad, Colorado.

Translator
In addition to the main station, KRTN-FM is relayed by an additional translator to widen its broadcast area.

References

External links

RTN-FM